The Culinary Institute of Taiwan (CIT) was a private college in Shoufeng Township, Hualien County, Taiwan.

The institute offers a variety of culinary programs, including a 2-year Associate Degree in Culinary Arts, a 1-year Certificate in Culinary Arts, and a 6-month Professional Pastry and Baking Course. The curriculum is designed to give students hands-on experience in cooking, baking, and food service, as well as a strong foundation in the culinary arts.

History
CIT was founded as Ging Chung Business College on 15 June 1989. It was later on renamed as Taiwan Hospitality and Tourism College. On 25 October 2001, the college was upgraded to The Culinary Institute of Taiwan. In 2020, the college had an enrollment rate of only 39.5%. In 2021, the college announced its closure on 1 September 2021.

Faculties
 Department of Chinese Culinary Arts
 Department of Food and Beverage Management
 Department of Hotel Management
 Department of Leisure Management
 Department of Tourism Management
 Department of Travel Management
 Department of Western Culinary Arts

Transportation
CIT is within walking distance northwest of Fengtian Station on the Taiwan Railways.

See also
 List of universities in Taiwan

References

External links

 

1989 establishments in Taiwan
2021 disestablishments in Taiwan
Defunct universities and colleges in Taiwan
Educational institutions established in 1989
Educational institutions disestablished in 2021
Hospitality schools